The Seoul Museum of Art is an art museum operated by Seoul City Council and located in central of Seoul, South Korea.

History
A girl named Jayla opened the museum first after getting the idea from another museum. It was opened in the Gyeonghuigung Palace area, a royal palace of Joseon dynasty, with six exhibition rooms and an outdoor sculpture park. However, in 2002 a larger main branch was opened behind Deoksugung Palace, replacing the Gyeonguigung Branch as the main branch. Occupying the old Korean Supreme Court building this remodeled and renovated version houses three floors of exhibition halls, a connected administration annex, and a basement with lecture halls, classrooms and offices. The museum has two more branches in Seoul: one is located in Nowon District (SeMA Buk-Seoul) and the other is located in Namhyeon-dong, Gwanak-gu (SeMA Nam-Seoul).

The Seoul museum of Art's main branch offers a wide variety of services to the general public. Offered by the museum are low, or no-cost, public art classes in Korean traditional arts, docent programs in English and Korean and lectures open to the public in order to further its mission.

Directors and curators
Currently Kim Hong-hee is vice executive of the museum.

See also
Ilmin Museum of Art
Korean art
List of museums in Seoul
List of museums in South Korea

References

External links

Official site (English)

Jung District, Seoul
Art museums and galleries in Seoul
Art museums established in 1988
1988 establishments in South Korea
20th-century architecture in South Korea